The 1986 New York gubernatorial election was held on November 4, 1986 to elect the Governor and Lieutenant Governor of New York. Incumbent Democratic governor Mario Cuomo defeated Republican Andrew O'Rourke, the County Executive of Westchester County in a landslide. Cuomo carried all but 5 counties.

Republican nomination

Candidates 
 Andrew P. O'Rourke, Westchester County Executive

Declined
James L. Emery, nominee for Lieutenant Governor in 1982 
Rudy Giuliani, U.S. Attorney for the Southern District of New York 
Roy M. Goodman, State Senator from Manhattan
Henry Kissinger, former U.S. Secretary of State
Lewis Lehrman, banker and nominee for Governor in 1982

Lewis Lehrman, the 1982 Republican nominee for Governor, decided early on not to mount another candidacy versus Cuomo. Lehrman's decision to forgo a candidacy was seen as a blow to state Republican leaders, given his strong performance in 1982 and wide fundraising capacity. Former Secretary of State Henry Kissinger considered running for Governor and was deemed an "able" challenger, and decision to ultimately pass on a candidacy also led to a leadership vacuum.

In the end, O'Rourke secured the Republican nomination, and was praised as an "extremely credible candidate" by White House official Bill Lacy. His running mate was E. Michael Kavanagh, who served as District Attorney of Ulster County.

Results

References

1986
Gubernatorial
New York